William Grozier (born 24 August 1956) is a Scottish former professional footballer who played in the Football League for Mansfield Town.

References

1956 births
Living people
Scottish footballers
Association football defenders
English Football League players
Mansfield Town F.C. players
Boston United F.C. players